A by-election was held for the New South Wales Legislative Assembly seat of Hawkesbury on Saturday, 17 February 1973. It was triggered by the resignation of Bernie Deane.

Dates

Results

Bernie Deane resigned.

See also
Electoral results for the district of Hawkesbury
List of New South Wales state by-elections

References

New South Wales state by-elections
1973 elections in Australia
1970s in New South Wales
February 1973 events in Australia